João Manuel Peixoto Ferreira (born 20 November 1978) is a Portuguese biologist and politician, serving as Member of the European Parliament for the Portuguese Communist Party; part of the European United Left–Nordic Green Left, where he was a vice-chair from 7 February 2012 to 30 June 2014, since 2009.

João Ferreira is a member of the Central Committee of the Portuguese Communist Party, and a member of the Lisbon Municipal Council.

References

External links
 

1978 births
Living people
Portuguese Communist Party MEPs
Candidates for President of Portugal
MEPs for Portugal 2009–2014
MEPs for Portugal 2014–2019
MEPs for Portugal 2019–2024